Brian Hill (31 July 1941 – 27 October 2016) was an English footballer who played in the Football League for Bristol City, Coventry City and Torquay United.

References

1941 births
2016 deaths
English footballers
English Football League players
Coventry City F.C. players
Bristol City F.C. players
Torquay United F.C. players
Bedworth United F.C. players
Association football defenders